Constance Alice "Connie" Birchfield (27 July 1898 – 9 May 1994) was a New Zealand housekeeper, trade unionist, hotel maid, communist, bookseller and political activist. She was born in Haydock, Lancashire, England on 27 July 1898.

She also stood for Brooklyn in the 1951 Brooklyn by-election, getting 129 votes.

References

1898 births
1994 deaths
New Zealand trade unionists
New Zealand activists
New Zealand women activists
English emigrants to New Zealand
New Zealand communists
Unsuccessful candidates in the 1949 New Zealand general election
Unsuccessful candidates in the 1951 New Zealand general election
Unsuccessful candidates in the 1954 New Zealand general election
People from Haydock
Trade unionists from Lancashire
New Zealand booksellers